Bob Bryan and Mike Bryan were the defending champions and successfully defended their title, defeating Scott Lipsky and David Martin 7–6(7–5), 6–2, in the final.

Seeds

Draw

Draw

External links
Draw

Doubles